The following is a list of tunnels in the Netherlands, including tunnels intended for motor vehicles, freight and passenger trains, light rail, and the Netherlands' Metro systems. There are also numerous pedestrian tunnels connected to the stations.

Road tunnels
Arenatunnel, Amsterdam
Beneluxtunnel
Botlektunnel
Coentunnel and Second Coen Tunnel, Amsterdam
Drechttunnel, Dordrecht
Heinenoordtunnel
Hubertustunnel, The Hague
IJtunnel, Amsterdam
Ketheltunnel, Schiedam
Kiltunnel, Dordrecht
Koningstunnel, The Hague
Maasboulevaardtunnel, Maastricht
Maastunnel, Rotterdam
Noordtunnel
Piet Hein Tunnel, Amsterdam
Roertunnel, Roermond
Schipholtunnel, A4 motorway near Amsterdam Airport
Sijtwendetunnel, Leidschendam-Voorburg, see also N14 expressway
Swalmentunnel
Stationsplein, Leiden
Stationstunnel, Venlo
Thomassentunnel
Velsertunnel
Vlaketunnel
Western Scheldt Tunnel (Dutch: Westerscheldetunnel)
Wijkertunnel
Zeeburgertunnel

Railroad tunnels
Botlek Rail Tunnel, Rotterdam
, Amsterdam under North Sea Canal
HSL-Zuid Tunnel Groene Hart 
railroad tunnels at Best, Rijswijk
Sophiaspoortunnel, part of Betuweroute
Schipholtunnel (railroad near Amsterdam Airport)
Velsertunnel under the North Sea Canal
Willemstunnel under Nieuwe Maas

Metro tunnels
northeast side of the Amsterdam metro system
central part  of the Rotterdam metro system
metro tunnel under the Nieuwe Maas waterway
metro tunnel under the Nieuwe Waterweg waterway, along Beneluxtunnel

Light-rail tunnels
tram tunnel Grote Marktstraat (TTGM), The Hague

Pedestrian tunnels
Maastunnel, Rotterdam also has tubes for pedestrians and cyclists

References

See also
Train routes in the Netherlands

Netherlands
Tunnels
 
Tunnels